Jollys Lookout is a rural locality in the Moreton Bay Region, Queensland, Australia.

Geography
The locality is located along Mount Nebo Road between The Gap in Brisbane and Mount Nebo.

Apart from the protected area, the rest of the locality is located on the slopes of the Annand Range and has a mix of rural residential properties and undeveloped land. There is a small area of grazing on native vegetation.

History
It is named after the popular lookout of the same name, which was named after Brisbane mayor, William Jolly, who visited the lookout about 1927.

Attractions 
The lookout is accessed from Mount Nebo Road.

References

Suburbs of Moreton Bay Region
Lookouts in Queensland
Localities in Queensland